"Where Do the Nights Go" is a song written by Mike Reid and Rory Bourke, and recorded by American country music artist Ronnie Milsap.  It was released in September 1987 as the third single from the album Heart & Soul.  The song was Milsap's thirty-third number one on the country chart.  The single went to number one for one week and spent thirteen weeks on the country chart.

Charts

References

Ronnie Milsap songs
1987 singles
Songs written by Mike Reid (singer)
Songs written by Rory Bourke
RCA Records singles
1987 songs